Qaleh-ye Azizbeyg (also Romanized as Qal‘eh-ye ‘Azīzbeyg; also known as Qal‘eh-ye ‘Azīz) is a village in Bash Qaleh Rural District, in the Central District of Urmia County, West Azerbaijan Province, Iran. At the 2006 census, its population was 290, in 70 families.

References 

Populated places in Urmia County